Hirosawa Dam  is a gravity dam located in Miyazaki Prefecture in Japan. The dam is used for irrigation. The catchment area of the dam is 43 km2. The dam impounds about 35  ha of land when full and can store 5100 thousand cubic meters of water. The construction of the dam was started on 1974 and completed in 2000.

See also
List of dams in Japan

References

Dams in Miyazaki Prefecture